Viacha Municipality is the first municipal section of the Ingavi Province in the  La Paz Department, Bolivia. Its seat is Viacha.

Division 
The municipality is subdivided into seven cantons:
Chacoma Irpa Grande - 1,247 inhabitants (2001) 
General José Ballivian - 452 inhabitants  
Ichuraya Grande - 332 inhabitants
Irpuma Irpa Grande - 1,078 inhabitants
Viacha - 46,596 inhabitants
Villa Remedios - 1,449 inhabitants
Villa Santiago de Chacoma - 438 inhabitants

The people 
The people are predominantly indigenous citizens of Aymara descent.

Places of interest 
Some of the tourist attractions of the municipality are:
 The town of Viacha 
 Viriloco lagoon, a small man made lake in Viacha Canton
 Qalachaka bridge in Viacha Canton
 "Virgen de Letanías" Sanctuary in Viacha Canton
 "Pan de Azúcar" mountain in Viacha Canton
 Fields of the Battle of Ingavi in Viacha Canton

See also 
 Katari River
 Q'awiri Qullu
 Wayllani

References 

 www.ine.gov.bo / census 2001: Viacha Municipality

External links 
 Viacha Municipality: population data and map (PDF; 630 kB) (Spanish) 

Municipalities of La Paz Department (Bolivia)